KMVN (105.7 FM) is a commercial radio station in Anchorage, Alaska, United States. Its studios are located on Business Park Boulevard in Anchorage, and its transmitter is located in Eagle River, Alaska.

Previously a smooth jazz station licensed as KNIK-FM, the call sign was a reference to the Knik River. On August 27, 2009, the station began stunting as a prelude to a format change by playing the top 100 songs of 1970 through 1989, one year per day. On September 15, 2009, KNIK-FM started playing a Light Rock and "Yesterday's Best Music" adult contemporary music format, branded as "Lite 105.7".  On September 16, 2009, KNIK-FM changed their call letters to KNLT.

On August 31, 2012, at 2:00 PM, after playing "Mary Jane's Last Dance" by Tom Petty, KNLT flipped to Rhythmic AC, as "Movin 105.7", launching with "Bust a Move" by Young MC.

On September 18, 2012, KNLT changed their call letters to KMVN, to go with the "Movin’ 105.7 FM" branding.

On March 8, 2019, Alaska Integrated Media sold sister station Alternative 94.7 KZND and KMVN to Robert and Tor Ingstad's Last Frontier Mediactive, a Fairbanks, Alaska-based radio company, for $1.25 million.  The sale closed on May 31, 2019.

References

External links
 
 

1961 establishments in Alaska
Radio stations established in 1961
MVN
Rhythmic adult contemporary radio stations